The 2015 Cincinnati Reds season was the 126th season for the franchise in Major League Baseball, and their 13th at Great American Ball Park, which hosted the 2015 Major League Baseball All-Star Game on Tuesday, July 14. The Reds finished the season with a record of 64–98, 36 games behind the St. Louis Cardinals, second-worst in the National League, and their worst finish since 1982.

Offseason
On December 11, 2014, the Reds acquired shortstop Eugenio Suárez and minor league pitcher Jonathan Crawford from the Detroit Tigers for pitcher Alfredo Simón. On the same day, the Reds Acquired pitcher Anthony DeSclafani and catcher Chad Wallach from the Miami Marlins for pitcher Mat Latos. 
On December 31, 2014, the Reds acquired outfielder Marlon Byrd from the Philadelphia Phillies for pitcher Ben Lively.

Standings

National League Central

National League Wildcard

Record vs. opponents

Regular season

Detailed record

Longest Winning Streak: 4 games (4/5–4/10 & 6/7-6/10)
Longest Losing Streak: 13 games (9/20–10/2)
Most Runs Scored in a game: 16 (4/21 @ MIL)
Most Runs Allowed in a game: 17 (7/26 @ COL)

Home attendance
(through 9/23/2015) Source: 2015 MLB Attendance Report  

Highest Home Attendance: 4/6 vs. PIT (43,633), 103% capacity
Lowest Home Attendance: 4/9 vs. PIT (15,616), 37% capacity

Season summary

Opening day lineup

Game log

|- style="text-align:center; background:#cfc"
| 1 || April 6 || Pirates || FSO || 5–2 || Diaz (1–0) || Watson (0–1) || Chapman (1) || 43,633 || 1–0 || 
|- style="text-align:center; background:#cfc"
| 2 || April 8 || Pirates || FSO || 5–4 (11) || Hoover (1–0) || Liz (0–1)  || || 30,859 || 2–0 || 
|- style="text-align:center; background:#cfc"
| 3 || April 9 || Pirates || FSO || 3–2 || Chapman (1–0) || Scahill (0–1) || || 15,616 || 3–0 || 
|- style="text-align:center; background:#cfc"
| 4 || April 10 || Cardinals  || FSO || 5–4 || Hoover (2–0) || Walden (0–1) || Chapman (2) || 30,808 || 4–0 || 
|- style="text-align:center; background:#fbb;"
| 5 || April 11 || Cardinals  || FSO || 1–4 || Wacha (1–0) || Cueto (0–1) || Rosenthal (2) || 41,525 || 4–1 || 
|- style="text-align:center; background:#fbb;"
| 6 || April 12 || Cardinals  || FSO || 5–7 (11) || Villanueva (1–0) || Gregg (0–1) || || 41,446 || 4–2 || 
|- style="text-align:center; background:#fbb;"
| 7 || April 13 || @ Cubs || FSO || 6–7 (10) || Rondón (1–0) || Parra (0–1) || || 26,390 || 4–3 || 
|- style="text-align:center; background:#cfc"
| 8 || April 14 || @ Cubs || FSO || 3–2 || DeSclafani (1–0) || Arrieta (0–1) || Chapman (3) || 27,525 || 5–3 || 
|- style="text-align:center; background:#fbb;"
| 9 || April 15 || @ Cubs || FSO || 0–5 || Wood (1–1) || Marquis (0–1) || || 29,205 || 5–4 || 
|- style="text-align:center; background:#fbb;"
| 10 || April 17 || @ Cardinals || FSO || 1–6 || Wacha (2–0) || Cueto (0–2) || Siegrist (1) || 46,462 || 5–5 || 
|- style="text-align:center; background:#fbb;"
| 11 || April 18 || @ Cardinals || FSO || 2–5 || Martínez (1–0) || Bailey (0–1) || Rosenthal (4) || 45,906 || 5–6 || 
|- style="text-align:center; background:#fbb;"
| 12 || April 19 || @ Cardinals || ESPN || 1–2 || Wainwright (2–1) || Leake (0–1) || Walden (1) || 40,742 || 5–7 || 
|- style="text-align:center; background:#cfc"
| 13 || April 20 || @ Brewers || FSO || 6–1 ||DeSclafani (2–0) || Peralta (0–2) || || 26,660 || 6–7 || 
|- style="text-align:center; background:#cfc"
| 14 || April 21 || @ Brewers || FSO || 16–10 ||Marquis (1–1) || Fiers (0–3) || || 27,293 || 7–7 || 
|- style="text-align:center; background:#cfc"
| 15 || April 22 || @ Brewers || FSO || 2–1 ||Cueto (1–2) || Rodríguez (0–3) || Chapman (4) || 30,452 || 8–7 || 
|- style="text-align:center; background:#fbb;"
| 16 || April 23 || @ Brewers || FSO || 2–4 || Lohse (1–2) || Gregg (0–2) || Rodríguez (2) || 30,452 || 8–8 || 
|- style="text-align:center; background:#fbb;"
| 17 || April 24 || Cubs || FSO || 6–7 (10) || Motte (1–0) || Badenhop (0–1) || || 39,891 || 8–9 || 
|- style="text-align:center; background:#bbb;"
| — || April 25 || Cubs ||colspan=8| PPD, RAIN; rescheduled for July 22
|- style="text-align:center; background:#fbb;"
| 18 || April 26 || Cubs || FSO || 2–5 || Arrieta (3–1) || DeSclafani (2–1) || Rondón (4) || 39,891 || 8–10 || 
|- style="text-align:center; background:#cfc"
| 19 || April 27 || Brewers || FSO || 9–6 || Marquis (2–1) || Nelson (2–1) || || 17,167 || 9–10 || 
|- style="text-align:center; background:#cfc"
| 20 || April 28 || Brewers || FSO || 4–2 || Cueto (2–2) || Lohse (1–4) || Chapman (5) || 19,238 || 10–10 || 
|- style="text-align:center; background:#fbb;"
| 21 || April 29 || Brewers || FSO || 3–8 || Garza (2–3) || Lorenzen (0–1) || || 23,012 || 10–11 || 
|- style="text-align:center; background:#cfc"
| 22 || April 30 || @ Braves || FSO || 5–1 || Leake (1–1) || Miller (3–1) ||  || 15,744 || 11–11 || 
|-

|- style="text-align:center; background:#fbb;"
| 23 || May 1 || @ Braves || FSO || 3–4 || Foltynewicz (1–0) || DeSclafani (2–2) || Grilli (8) || 30,153 || 11–12 || 
|- style="text-align:center; background:#cfc"
| 24 || May 2 || @ Braves || FS1 || 8–4 || Marquis (3–1) || Stults (1–2) || || 29,515 || 12–12 || 
|- style="text-align:center; background:#fbb;"
| 25 || May 3 || @ Braves || FSO || 0–5 || Teherán (1–1) || Cueto (2–3) || || 30,073 || 12–13 || 
|- style="text-align:center; background:#cfc"
| 26 || May 5 || @ Pirates || FSO || 7–1 || Lorenzen (1–1) || Locke (2–2) || || 16,822 || 13–13 || 
|- style="text-align:center; background:#cfc"
| 27 || May 6 || @ Pirates || FSO || 3–0 || Leake (2–1) || Cole (4–1) || Chapman (6) || 16,527|| 14–13 || 
|- style="text-align:center; background:#fbb;"
| 28 || May 7 || @ Pirates || FSO || 2–7 || Burnett (1–1) || DeSclafani (2–3) || || 27,302|| 14–14 ||  
|- style="text-align:center; background:#bbb;"
| — || May 8 || @ White Sox  ||colspan=8| PPD, RAIN; rescheduled for May 8 
|- style="text-align:center; background:#cfc"
| 29 || May 9 || @ White Sox || FSO || 10–4 || Cueto (3–3) || Carroll (0–1) || || N/A || 15–14 ||   
|- style="text-align:center; background:#fbb;"
| 30 || May 9 || @ White Sox || FSO || 2–8 || Rodon (3–3) || Marquis (3–2) || || 27,980 || 15–15 ||   
|- style="text-align:center; background:#fbb;"
| 31 || May 10 || @ White Sox || FSO || 3–4 || Robertson (3–0) || Chapman (1-1) || || 20,123|| 15–16 ||  
|- style="text-align:center; background:#fbb;"
| 32 || May 11 || Braves || FSO/ESPN || 1–2 || Avilán (1–0) || Chapman (1-2) || Johnson (2) || 19,881 || 15–17 ||  
|- style="text-align:center; background:#cfc"
| 33 || May 12 || Braves || FSO || 4–3 || Chapman (2–2) || Grilli (0–2) || || 23,780 || 16–17 || 
|- style="text-align:center; background:#cfc"
| 34 || May 13 || Braves || FSO || 5–1 || Iglesias (1–0) || Stults (1–4) || || 17,747 || 17–17 || 
|- style="text-align:center; background:#cfc"
| 35 || May 14 || Giants || FSO || 4–3 || Diaz (1–0) || Romo (0–2) || Chapman (7) || 21,792 || 18–17 || 
|- style="text-align:center; background:#fbb;"
| 36 || May 15 || Giants || FSO || 2–10 || Bumgarner (4–2) || Marquis (3–3) || || 39,867 || 18–18 || 
|- style="text-align:center; background:#fbb;"
| 37 || May 16 || Giants || FSO || 2–11 || Vogelsong (2–2) || Leake (2–2) || || 40,889|| 18–19 || 
|- style="text-align:center; background:#fbb;"
| 38 || May 17 || Giants || FSO || 8–9 || Petit (1–0) || DeSclafani (2–4) || Casilla (9) || 39,209 || 18–20 || 
|- style="text-align:center; background:#fbb;"
| 39 || May 19 || @ Royals || FSO || 0–3 || Ventura (3–3) || Cueto (3–4) || Davis (7) || 29,769 || 18–21 || 
|- style="text-align:center; background:#fbb;"
| 40 || May 20 || @ Royals || FSO || 1–7 || Guthrie (4–2) || Marquis (3–4) ||    ||  30,450  ||  18–22  || 
|- style="text-align:center; background:#fbb;"
| 41 || May 22 || @ Indians || FSO || 3–7 || Carrasco (5–4) || Leake (2–3) ||    ||  23,617  ||  18–23 ||
|- style="text-align:center; background:#fbb;"
| 42 || May 23 || @ Indians || FSO || 1–2 || Kluber (2–5) || Cingrani (0–1) || Allen (11) || 27,315 || 18–24 || 
|- style="text-align:center; background:#fbb;"
| 43 || May 24 || @ Indians || FSO || 2–5 || Bauer (4–1) || Iglesias (1–1) ||  || 23,882 || 18–25 || 
|- style="text-align:center; background:#fbb;"
| 44 || May 25 || Rockies || FSO || 4–5 || Betancourt (2–1) || Chapman (2–3) || Axford (7) || 20,516 || 18–26 || 
|- style="text-align:center; background:#cfc;"
| 45 || May 26 || Rockies || FSO || 2–1 || Chapman (3–3) || Brown (0–2) ||  || 22,523 || 19–26 || 
|- style="text-align:center; background:#fbb;"
| 46 || May 27 || Rockies ||   || 4–6 || Kendrick (2–6) || Leake (2–4) || Axford (8) || 23,917 || 19–27 || 
|- style="text-align:center; background:#cfc;"
| 47 || May 29 || Nationals || FSO || 5–2 || DeSclafani (3–4) || Jordan (0–1) || Chapman (8) || 28,877 || 20–27 || 
|- style="text-align:center; background:#cfc;"
| 48 || May 30 || Nationals || FSO || 8–5 || Hoover (3–0) || Janssen (0–1) || Chapman (9) || 36,294 || 21–27 || 
|- style="text-align:center; background:#cfc;"
| 49 || May 31 || Nationals || FSO || 8–2 || Hoover (4–0) || Barrett (3–1) ||  || 31,874 || 22–27 || 
|-

|- style="text-align:center; background:#fbb"
| 50 || June 2 || @ Phillies || FSO || 4–5 || Papelbon (1–0) || Cingrani (0–2) ||  || 20,209 || 22–28 || 
|- style="text-align:center; background:#fbb"
| 51 || June 3 || @ Phillies || FSO || 4–5  || García (2–1) || Mattheus (0–1) ||  || 21,253 || 22–29 || 
|- style="text-align:center; background:#cfc"
| 52 || June 4 || @ Phillies || FSO || 6–4 || DeSclafani (4–4) || Harang (4–6) || Chapman (10) || 21,057 || 23–29 || 
|- style="text-align:center; background:#fbb"
| 53 || June 5 || Padres || FSO || 2–6 || Ross (3–5) || Moscot (0–1) ||   || 33,381 || 23–30 || 
|- style="text-align:center; background:#fbb"
| 54 || June 6 || Padres || FSO || 7–9 || Maurer (2–0) || Díaz (2–1) || Kimbrel (13) || 40,946 || 23–31 || 
|- style="text-align:center; background:#cfc"
| 55 || June 7 || Padres || FSO || 4–0 || Cueto (4–4) || Despaigne (3–4) ||  || 27,501 || 24–31 || 
|- style="text-align:center; background:#cfc"
| 56 || June 8 || Phillies || FSO || 6–4 || Leake (3–4) || Hamels (5–5) || Chapman (11) || 30,900 || 25–31 || 
|- style="text-align:center; background:#cfc"
| 57 || June 9 || Phillies || FSO || 11–2 || DeSclafani (5–4) || Harang (4–7) || || 27,993 || 26–31 || 
|- style="text-align:center; background:#cfc"
| 58 || June 10 || Phillies || || 5–2 || Moscot (1–1) || Williams (3–6) || Chapman (12) || 32,994 || 27–31 || 
|- style="text-align:center; background:#fbb"
| 59 || June 11 || @ Cubs || FSO || 3–6 || Wood (3–2) || Lorenzen (1–2) || Rondón (11) || 35,031 || 27–32 || 
|- style="text-align:center; background:#cfc"
| 60 || June 12 || @ Cubs || FSO || 5–4  || Hoover (5–0) || Rondón (3–1) || Chapman (13) || 40,016 || 28–32 || 
|- style="text-align:center; background:#fbb"
| 61 || June 13 || @ Cubs || Fox || 3–4 || Motte (3–1) || Cingrani (0–3) || || 40,693 || 28–33 || 
|- style="text-align:center; background:#fbb"
| 62 || June 14 || @ Cubs || ESPN || 1–2  || Schlitter (1–2) || Badenhop (0–2) || || 33,201 || 28–34 || 
|- style="text-align:center; background:#fbb"
| 63 || June 15 || @ Tigers || FSO || 0–6 || Sánchez (5–7) || Villarreal (0–1) || || 29,884 || 28–35 || 
|- style="text-align:center; background:#cfc"
| 64 || June 16 || @ Tigers || FSO || 5–2 || Lorenzen (2–2) || Ryan (1–1) || Chapman (14) || 33,744 || 29–35 || 
|- style="text-align:center; background:#cfc"
| 65 || June 17 || Tigers || FSO || 8–4  || Badenhop (1–2) || Krol (1–1) || || 32,456 || 30–35 || 
|- style="text-align:center; background:#bbb;"
| — || June 18 || Tigers ||colspan=8| PPD, RAIN; rescheduled for August 24
|- style="text-align:center; background:#cfc"
| 66 || June 19 || Marlins || FSO || 5–0 || Leake (4–4) || Haren (1–1) || || 33,379 || 31–35 || 
|- style="text-align:center; background:#fbb"
| 67 || June 20 || Marlins || FSO || 0–5 || Nicolino (4–4) || DeSclafani (5–5) || || 36,755 || 31–36 || 
|- style="text-align:center; background:#cfc"
| 68 || June 21 || Marlins || FSO || 5–2 || Lorenzen (3–2) || Phelps (4–4) || Chapman (15) || 36,780 || 32–36 || 
|- style="text-align:center; background:#fbb"
| 69 || June 23 || @ Pirates || FSO || 6–7 || Scahill (2–3) || Villarreal (0–2) || Melancon (24) || 26,949 || 32–37 || 
|- style="text-align:center; background:#cfc"
| 70 || June 24 || @ Pirates || FSO || 5–2 || Leake (5–4) || Cole (11–3) || Hoover (1) || 37,359 || 33–37 || 
|- style="text-align:center; background:#cfc"
| 71 || June 25 || @ Pirates || FSO || 5–4  || Villarreal (1–2) || Scahill (2–4) || || 35,015 || 34–37 || 
|- style="text-align:center; background:#fbb"
| 72 || June 26 || @ Mets || FSO || 1–2 || Syndergaard (3–4) || Cueto (4–5) || Familia (21) || 35,015 || 34–38 || 
|- style="text-align:center; background:#fbb"
| 73 || June 27 || @ Mets || FSO || 1–2  || Parnell (1–0) || Adcock (0–1) || || 32,531 || 34–39 || 
|- style="text-align:center; background:#fbb"
| 74 || June 28 || @ Mets || FSO || 2–7 || Matz (1–0) || Smith (0–1) || || 29,640 || 34–40 || 
|- style="text-align:center; background:#cfc"
| 75 || June 29 || Twins || FSO || 11–7 || Adcock (1–1) || Pelfrey (5–5) || || 28,940 || 35–40 || 
|- style="text-align:center; background:#fbb"
| 76 || June 30 || Twins || FSO || 5–8 || Hughes (1–1) || DeSclafani (5–6) || Perkins (25) || 28,556 || 35–41 || 
|-

|- style="text-align:center; background:#cfc"
| 77 || July 1 || Twins ||   || 2–1 || Cueto (5–5) || May (4–7) || Chapman (16) || 26,459 || 36–41 || 
|- style="text-align:center; background:#fbb"
| 78 || July 3 || Brewers || FSO || 1–12 || Fiers (4–7) || Lorenzen (3–3) || || 40,760 || 36–42 || 
|- style="text-align:center; background:#fbb"
| 79 || July 4 || Brewers || Fox || 3–7 || Nelson (6–8) || Smith (0–2) || || 38,663 || 36–43 || 
|- style="text-align:center; background:#fbb"
| 80 || July 5 || Brewers || FSO || 1–6 || Jungmann (3–1) || Leake (5–5) || || 28,881 || 36–44 || 
|- style="text-align:center; background:#cfc"
| 81 || July 6 || @ Nationals || FSO || 3–2 || Parra (1–1) || Janssen (0–2) || Chapman (17) || 23,673  || 37–44 || 
|- style="text-align:center; background:#cfc"
| 82 || July 7 || @ Nationals || FSO || 5–0 || Cueto (6–5) || Scherzer (9–7) || || 31,898 || 38–44 || 
|- style="text-align:center; background:#bbb;"
| – || July 8 || @ Nationals ||colspan=8| PPD, RAIN; rescheduled for September 28
|- style="text-align:center; background:#fbb"
| 83 || July 9 || @ Marlins || FSO || 0–2 || Fernández (2–0) || Lorenzen (3–4) || Ramos (14) || 25,027 || 38–45 || 
|- style="text-align:center; background:#cfc"
| 84 || July 10 || @ Marlins || FSO || 1–0 || Leake (6–5) || Phelps (4–5) || Chapman (18) || 22,222 || 39–45 || 
|- style="text-align:center; background:#fbb"
| 85 || July 11 || @ Marlins || FSO || 3–14 || Conley (1–0) || Iglesias (1–2) || || 21,052 || 39–46 || 
|- style="text-align:center; background:#fbb;"
| 86 || July 12 || @ Marlins || FSO || 1–8 || Haren (7–5) || Cueto (6–6) || || 23,842 || 39–47 || 
|- style="text-align:center;"
| colspan="11" style="background:#bbcaff;"|July 14: 2015 MLB All-Star Game – Cincinnati, Ohio at Great American Ball Park 
|- style="text-align:center; background:#cfc"
| 87 || July 17 || Indians || FSO || 6–1 || Leake (7–5)  || Bauer (8–6) ||  || 38,932  || 40–47 ||  
|- style="text-align:center; background:#fbb"
| 88 || July 18 || Indians || FS1 || 4–9 || Kluber (5–10) || DeSclafani (5–7) ||  || 39,588 || 40–48 || 
|- style="text-align:center; background:#fbb"
| 89 || July 19 || Indians || FSO || 3–5 (11) || Rzepczynski (2–3) || Villarreal  (1–3) || McAllister (1)  || 36,302 || 40–49 || 
|- style="text-align:center; background:#cfc"
| 90 || July 20 || Cubs || FSO || 5–4 || Mattheus (1–1) || Grimm (1–3) || Chapman (19) || 34,900 || 41–49 || 
|- style="text-align:center; background:#fbb"
| 91 || July 21 || Cubs || FSO || 4–5 (13) || Motte (7–1) || Adcock (1–2) || Grimm (2) || 36,845 || 41–50 || 
|- style="text-align:center; background:#cfc"
| 92 || July 22 || Cubs ||FSO || 9–1 || Leake (8–5) || Hendricks (4–5) ||  || 35,093 || 42–50 || 
|- style="text-align:center; background:#fbb"
| 93 || July 22 || Cubs || FSO || 5–6 || Rondon (4–2) || Chapman (3–4) || Motte (6) || 39,183 || 42–51 || 
|- style="text-align:center; background:#fbb"
| 94 || July 24 || @ Rockies || FSO || 5–6 || Axford (3–3) || Mattheus (1–2) ||  || 37,184 || 42–52 || 
|- style="text-align:center; background:#cfc"
| 95 || July 25 || @ Rockies || FSO || 5–2 || Cueto (7–6) || Rusin (3–4) || Chapman (20) || 41,998 || 43–52 || 
|- style="text-align:center; background:#fbb"
| 96 || July 26 || @ Rockies || FSO || 7–17 || Kendrick (4–11) || Lorenzen (3–5) ||  || 46,828 || 43–53 || 
|- style="text-align:center; background:#fbb"
| 97 || July 27 || @ Cardinals || FSO || 1–4 || Lynn (8–5) || Iglesias (1–3) || Rosenthal (31) || 42,553 || 43–54 || 
|- style="text-align:center; background:#cfc"
| 98 || July 28 || @ Cardinals || FSO || 4–0 || Leake (9–5) || Garcia (3–4) || || 41,466 || 44-54 || 
|- style="text-align:center; background:#cfc"
| 99 || July 29 || @ Cardinals || FSO || 1–0 || DeSclafani (6–7) || Lackey (9–6) || Chapman (21) || 42,334 || 45–54 || 
|- style="text-align:center; background:#cfc"
| 100 || July 30 || Pirates || FSO || 15–5 || Holmberg (1–0) || Burnett (8–5) || || 35,715 || 46–54 || 
|- style="text-align:center; background:#fbb"
| 101 || July 31 || Pirates || FSO || 4–5 || Locke (6–6) || Lorenzen (3–6) || Melancon (33) || 35,088 || 46–55 || 
|-

|- style="text-align:center; background:#cfc"
| 102 || August 1 || Pirates || FSO || 5–4 || Iglesias (4–3) ||  Cole (14–5) || Chapman (22) || 42,284 || 47–55 || 
|- style="text-align:center; background:#fbb"
| 103 || August 2 || Pirates || FSO || 0–3 || Morton (7–4) || Sampson (0–1) || Soria (33) || 39,956 || 47–56 || 
|- style="text-align:center; background:#cfc"
| 104 || August 4 || Cardinals || FSO || 3–2 || DeSclafani (7–7) || Lackey (9–7) || Chapman (23) || 25,969 || 48–56 || 
|- style="text-align:center; background:#fbb"
| 105 || August 5 || Cardinals || FSO || 3–4 (13) || Maness (4–1) || Axelrod (0–1) || || 34,700 || 48–57 || 
|- style="text-align:center; background:#fbb"
| 106 || August 6 || Cardinals || FSO || 0–3 || Wacha (13–4) || Lorenzen (3–7) || Rosenthal (32) || 26,053 || 48–58 || 
|- style="text-align:center; background:#fbb"
| 107 || August 7 || @ D-backs || FSO || 0–2 || Anderson (5–4) || Iglesias (2–4) || Ziegler (20) || 26,836 || 48–59 || 
|- style="text-align:center; background:#cfc"
| 108 || August 8 || @ D-backs || FSO || 4–1 || Sampson (1–1) || Ray (3–7) || Chapman (24) || 40,512 || 49–59 || 
|- style="text-align:center; background:#fbb"
| 109 || August 9 || @ D-backs || FSO || 3–4 (10) || Collmenter (4–6) || Mattheus (1–3) ||  || 28,116 || 49–60 ||
|- style="text-align:center; background:#fbb"
| 110 || August 10 || @ Padres || FSO || 1–2 || Kennedy (7–10) || Holmberg (1–1) || Kimbrel (32) || 23,223 || 49–61 ||
|- style="text-align:center; background:#fbb"
| 111 || August 11 || @ Padres || FSO || 6–11 || Rea (1–0) || Lorenzen (3–8) ||  || 26,588 || 49–62 ||
|- style="text-align:center; background:#cfc"
| 112 || August 12 || @ Padres || FSO || 7–3 || Iglesias (3–4) || Shields (8–5) ||  || 21,397 || 50–62 ||
|- style="text-align:center; background:#cfc"
| 113 || August 13 || @ Dodgers || FSO || 10–3 || Sampson (2–1) || Latos (4–9) ||  || 47,216 || 51–62 ||
|- style="text-align:center; background:#fbb"
| 114 || August 14 || @ Dodgers || FSO || 3–5 || Wood (8–7) || Lamb (0–1) || Jansen (23) || 43,407 || 51–63 ||
|- style="text-align:center; background:#fbb"
| 115 || August 15 || @ Dodgers || FSO || 3–8 || Anderson (7–7) || Holmberg (1–2) ||  || 46,807 || 51–64 ||
|- style="text-align:center; background:#fbb"
| 116 || August 16 || @ Dodgers || FSO || 1–2 || Greinke (13–2) || DeSclafani (7–8) || Jansen (24) || 47,388 || 51–65 ||
|- style="text-align:center; background:#fbb"
| 117 || August 18 || Royals || FSO || 1–3 (13) || Medlen (1–0) || Mattheus (1–4) || Holland (27) || 28,719 || 51–66 ||
|- style="text-align:center; background:#fbb"
| 118 || August 19 || Royals || FSO ||  3–4  ||  Hochevar (1–0)  ||  Sampson (2–2)  ||  Davis (10)  ||  18,078  ||  51–67  ||
|- style="text-align:center; background:#fbb"
| 119 || August 20 || D-backs || FSO ||  4–5 ||  Hernandez (1–3)  ||  Badenhop (1–3)  ||  Ziegler (22)  ||  22,063  ||  51–68  ||
|- style="text-align:center; background:#fbb"
| 120 || August 21 || D-backs || FSO ||  3–6  || De La Rosa (11–5) || Holmberg (1–3)   ||  Ziegler (23)  ||  26,757  ||  51–69  || 
|- style="text-align:center; background:#fbb"
| 121 || August 22 || D-backs || FSO ||  7–11  ||  Godley (4–0)  ||  DeSclafani (7–9)  ||  Hudson (2)  ||  36,216  ||  51–70  ||
|- style="text-align:center; background:#fbb"
| 122 || August 23 || D-backs || FSO ||  0–4  ||  Anderson (6–5)  ||  Iglesias (3–5)  ||    ||  27,656  ||  51–71  ||
|- style="text-align:center; background:#cfc"
| 123 || August 24 || Tigers ||   || 12–5  || Balester (1–0)   ||  Alburquerque (3–1)   ||    ||  30,150  ||  52–71  ||
|- style="text-align:center; background:#fbb"
| 124 || August 25 || Dodgers || FSO ||  1–5  ||  Wood (9–8)  ||  Lamb (0–2)  ||    ||  22,783  ||  52–72  ||
|- style="text-align:center; background:#fbb"
| 125 || August 26 || Dodgers || FSO ||  4–7  ||  Anderson (8–8)  ||  Holmberg (1–4)  ||  Jansen (25)  ||  17,712  ||  52–73  ||
|- style="text-align:center; background:#fbb"
| 126 || August 27 || Dodgers ||  ||   0–1   || Greinke (14–3)  ||  DeSclafani (7–10)   ||  Johnson (10)  ||  25,529  ||  52–74  ||
|- style="text-align:center; background:#fbb"
| 127 || August 28 || @ Brewers || FSO || 0–5 ||  Jungmann (8–5)  ||  Iglesias (3–6)  ||    || 27,632  ||  52–75  ||
|- style="text-align:center; background:#cfc"
| 128 || August 29 || @ Brewers || FSO ||  12–9  ||  Hoover (6–0)  || Rodriguez (0–3)   ||  Chapman (25)  ||  34,365  ||  53–75  ||
|- style="text-align:center; background:#fbb"
| 129 || August 30 || @ Brewers || FSO ||  1–4  ||  Peralta (5–8)  ||  Lamb (0–3)  ||  Rodriguez (31)  ||  33,293  ||  53–76  ||
|- style="text-align:center; background:#cfc"
| 130 || August 31 || @ Cubs || FSO || 13–6  ||  Mattheus (2–4)  ||  Grimm (2–4)  ||   Chapman (26)  || 34,017   ||  54–76  ||
|-

|- style="text-align:center; background:#fbb"
| 131 || September 1 || @ Cubs || FSO ||  4–5  ||  Rodney (6–5)  || Badenhop (1–4)   ||  Rondon (25)  ||  33,756  ||  54–77  ||
|- style="text-align:center; background:#cfc"
| 132 || September 2 || @ Cubs ||   ||  7–4   || Hoover (7–0) ||  Rondon (5–3)  ||  Chapman (27)  || 31,165   ||  55–77  ||
|- style="text-align:center; background:#bbb"
| — || September 4 || Brewers || || colspan=8| PPD, RAIN; rescheduled for September 5  
|- style="text-align:center; background:#fbb"
| 133 || September 5 || Brewers || FSO ||  6–8  ||  Jeffress (5–0)  ||  Hoover (7–1)  ||  Rodríguez (34)  ||  28,632  ||  55–78  ||
|- style="text-align:center; background:#fbb"
| 134 || September 5 || Brewers || FSO ||  3–7  ||  Pena (1–0)  ||  Sampson (2–3)  ||    ||  29,842  ||  55–79  ||
|- style="text-align:center; background:#cfc"
| 135 || September 6 || Brewers || FSO ||  6–3  ||  Lorenzen (4–8)  ||  Nelson (11–11)  ||  Chapman (28)  ||  28,027  ||  56–79  ||
|- style="text-align:center; background:#cfc"
| 136 || September 7 || Pirates || FSO ||  3–1  ||  DeSclafani (8–10)  ||  Locke (7–10)  ||  Chapman (29)  ||  19,241  ||  57–79  ||
|- style="text-align:center; background:#fbb"
| 137 || September 8 || Pirates || FSO ||  3–7  ||  Liriano (10–7)  ||  Iglesias (3–7)  ||    ||  16,151  ||  57–80  ||
|- style="text-align:center; background:#fbb"
| 138 || September 9 || Pirates || FSO ||   4–5  ||  Morton (9–7)  ||  Sampson (2–4)  ||  Melancon (44)   ||  19,620  ||  57–81  ||
|- style="text-align:center; background:#cfc"
| 139 || September 10 || Cardinals || FSO ||  11–0  ||  Lamb (1–3)  ||  García (8–5)  ||    ||  16,363  ||  58–81  ||
|- style="text-align:center; background:#cfc"
| 140 || September 11 || Cardinals || FSO ||  4–2  ||  Hoover (8–1)  ||  Broxton (2–5)  ||  Chapman (30)  ||  31,427  ||  59–81  ||
|- style="text-align:center; background:#cfc"
| 141 || September 12 || Cardinals || Fox ||  5–1  ||  DeSclafani (9–10)  ||  Lynn (11–10)  ||    ||  41,137  || 60–81   ||
|- style="text-align:center; background:#fbb"
| 142 || September 13 || Cardinals ||   ||  2–9  || Wacha (16–5)  ||  LeCure (0–1)   ||   ||  29,900  ||  60–82  ||
|- style="text-align:center; background:#fbb"
| 143 || September 14 || @ Giants || FSO ||  3–5  || Kontos (3–2)  || Sampson (2–5)   ||  Casilla (33)   ||  41,025  ||  60–83  ||
|- style="text-align:center; background:#cfc"
| 144 || September 15 || @ Giants || FSO ||  9–8 (10)  ||  Chapman (4–4)  ||  Romo (0–5)  ||  Diaz (1)  ||  41,044  ||  61–83  ||
|- style="text-align:center; background:#fbb"
| 145 || September 16 || @ Giants || FSO ||  3–5  ||  Peavy (7–6)  ||  Lorenzen (4–9)  ||  Casilla (34)  ||  41,383  ||  61–84  ||
|- style="text-align:center; background:#cfc"
| 146 || September 18 || @ Brewers || FSO ||  5–3  ||  Finnegan (1–0)  ||  Davies (1–2)  ||  Chapman (31)  ||  37,158  ||  62–84  ||
|- style="text-align:center; background:#cfc"
| 147 || September 19 || @ Brewers || FSO ||  9–7  ||  Badenhop (2–4)  ||  Cravy (0–7)  ||  Chapman (32)  ||  30,387  ||  63–84  ||
|- style="text-align:center; background:#fbb"
| 148 || September 20 || @ Brewers || FSO ||  4–8  ||  Pena (2–0)  ||  DeSclafani (9–11)  ||    ||  29,479  ||  63–85  ||
|- style="text-align:center; background:#fbb"
| 149 || September 21 || @ Cardinals || FSO ||  1–2  ||  Broxton (3–5)  ||  Hoover (8–2)  ||   Rosenthal (47) ||  43,902  ||  63–86  ||
|- style="text-align:center; background:#fbb"
| 150 || September 22 || @ Cardinals || FSO ||  1–3  ||  Lackey (13–9)  ||  LeCure (0–2)  ||  Cishek (4)  ||  43,981  ||  63–87  ||
|- style="text-align:center; background:#fbb"
| 151 || September 23 || @ Cardinals || FSO ||  2–10  ||  Lynn (12–10)  ||  Finnegan (4–1)  ||    ||  43,729  ||  63–88  ||
|- style="text-align:center; background:#fbb"
| 152 || September 24 || Mets || FSO ||  4–6  ||  Goeddel (1–1)  ||  Parra (1–2)  ||  Familia (42)  ||  18,881  ||  63–89  ||
|- style="text-align:center; background:#fbb"
| 153 || September 25 || Mets || FSO ||  5–12  ||  Syndergaard (9–7)  ||  DeSclafani (9–12)  ||    ||  26,780  ||   63–90  ||
|- style="text-align:center; background:#fbb"
| 154 || September 26 || Mets || FSO ||  2–10  ||  Harvey (13–7)  ||  Lamb (1–4)  ||    ||  32,293  ||  63–91  ||
|- style="text-align:center; background:#fbb"
| 155 || September 27 || Mets ||   ||  1–8  ||  deGrom (14–8)  ||  Sampson (2–6)  ||    ||  24,621  ||  63–92  ||
|- style="text-align:center; background:#fbb"
| 156 || September 28 || @ Nationals ||   ||  1–5  ||  Scherzer (13–12)  || Finnegan (4–2)   ||    ||  24,420  ||  63–93  ||
|- style="text-align:center; background:#fbb"
| 157 || September 29 || Cubs || FSO ||  1–4  ||  Haren (10–9)  ||  Smith (0–3)  ||  Wood (3)  ||  18,168  ||  63–94  ||
|- style="text-align:center; background:#fbb"
| 158 || September 30 || Cubs || FSO ||  3–10  ||  Lester (11–12)  ||  DeSclafani (9–13)  ||    ||  21,397  ||  63–95  ||
|-

|- style="text-align:center; background:#fbb"
| 159 || October 1 || Cubs||   ||  3–5  ||  Hammel (10–7)  ||  Lamb (1–5)  ||  Rondon (29)  ||  26,352  ||  63–96  ||
|- style="text-align:center; background:#fbb"
| 160 || October 2 || @ Pirates || FSO ||   4–6 (12) || Caminero (5–1) ||   Balester (1–1) ||    ||  31,442  ||  63–97  ||
|- style="text-align:center; background:#cfc"
| 161 || October 3 || @ Pirates || FSO ||  3–1  ||  Finnegan (5–2)  || Burnett (9–7)   ||  Chapman (33)  ||  34,180  ||  64–97  ||
|- style="text-align:center; background:#fbb"
| 162 || October 4 || @ Pirates || FSO ||  0–4  ||  Happ (11–8)  ||  Smith (0–4)  ||    ||  35,362  ||  64–98  ||
|-

| 
Legend
  = Win
  = Loss
  = Postponement
 Bold = Reds team member

Roster

Statistics
Through October 4, 2015

Batting
Note: G = Games played; AB = At bats; R = Runs scored; H = Hits; 2B = Doubles; 3B = Triples; HR = Home runs; RBI = Runs batted in; BB = Base on balls; SO = Strikeouts; AVG = Batting average; SB = Stolen bases

Pitching
Note: W = Wins; L = Losses; ERA = Earned run average; G = Games pitched; GS = Games started; SV = Saves; IP = Innings pitched; H = Hits allowed; R = Runs allowed; ER = Earned runs allowed; HR = Home runs allowed; BB = Walks allowed; K = Strikeouts

Farm system

Minor League Baseball standings

References

External links

2015 Cincinnati Reds at Baseball Reference
 Official Website 

Cincinnati Reds seasons
Cincinnati Reds
Cincinnati Reds